The Taichung MRT (also called Taichung Mass Rail Transit or Taichung Metro) is a rapid transit system in Taichung, Taiwan. In addition to Taichung, it may serve Changhua and Nantou counties in the future. Taichung Metro's first route, the Green Line, officially began operation on April 25, 2021, making it the 5th rapid transit system operating in Taiwan.

History
Planning of the Taichung MRT started in 1990 with a study conducted by the Taiwanese Bureau of Housing and Urban Development. The study was completed in 1998 and suggested the implementation of three routes (Red, Green, and Blue). The project was formally approved by the Executive Yuan of the ROC government on 23 November 2004. The city government signed a joint development contract with the Taipei City Government on 12 December 2007.

Meanwhile, the Taichung City Government started their own planning of more lines and decided that the much cheaper BRT system would be the future of mass transit in Taichung. Since the corridor of the originally proposed Red Line is partially served by the TRA mass transit construction, the Blue Line corridor was chosen as a first step to implement BRT in Taichung.

Construction of the first line, the Green Line, had been paid for and was expected to begin in October 2007, though it was pushed back and started construction on 8 October 2009. The  section of the Green Line was scheduled for completion by 2020 and includes 18 stations.

On 9 March 2011, Kawasaki Heavy Industries announced that it had won a joint order with Alstom Transport SA (France) and CTCI Corp. (Taiwan) to supply 36 units consisting of two-car, driverless trains totaling 29.5 billion yen. While Kawasaki will oversee construction, Alstom will focus on signaling and CTCI will supply the electrical system.

On 16 November 2020, the Green Line started trial runs. The first day of trial runs attracted more than 70,000 rides. The trial runs were suspended on 21 November 2020 when a railway coupler snapped in half. On 10 March 2021, Taichung Mayor Lu Shiow-yen (盧秀燕) announced that trial runs will resume on March 25, 2021, and the opening ceremony will be a month after. The Green Line officially began operation as scheduled on April 25, 2021, making it the 5th rapid transit system operating in Taiwan.

Network

Green line

The Green line between Beitun and Wuri is an elevated railway with driverless electric trains. It stretchs from Songzhu Road in Beitun District of Taichung along Beitun Road, Wenxin Road, and Wenxin South Road to the High Speed Rail Station in the Wuri District. It was expected to cost NT$53.491 billion, and was built by the Taipei City Department of Rapid Transit Systems. The planned total cost for the project is NT$51.39 billion (including land acquisition costs), which is split between the local and central government.

The Green line began trial operation on 16 November 2020 and was supposed to start formal operations on 19 December 2020. The trial run was suspended on 19 November 2020  when a railway coupler snapped in half. The trial resumed on March 25, 2021 and the line officially opened on April 25, 2021.

Fares
Fares for the Taichung Metro start at NT$20 and are capped at NT$50. The fare increases by NT$5 for every 2 kilometers traveled.

Future Expansion

Blue line 

The BRT Blue line began its operation in 2014, as a BRT system running between Providence University and the Taichung Railway Station. It ran along the busy Taiwan Boulevard, on a designated lane made specifically for BRT. Bus stations were built on the divider between the fast and slow lanes on the road. It was the first articulated bus system in Taiwan. The service ended on 8 July 2015 due to the new policy announced by Mayor Lin Chia-lung on 30 March 2015. The designated BRT Lane was changed to an ordinary bus lane, allowing other buses that operate primarily on Taiwan Boulevard to use the lane. The articulated buses that originally ran the route became known as bus route 300.
Currently it is a designated bus lane for multiple routes.

A MRT system running the same route is currently being planned.

Orange line
A fourth line was planned in 2009 to connect the city with Taichung Airport. However, after multiple proposals to build a MRT and BRT line were rejected by the Ministry of Transportation and Communications, the city government turned to an LRT system. While the system was still being planned, they switched to a MRT system again. In 2019, MRT project substituted for LRT project. In 2021, LRT project switched back to the original MRT project again.

Kenan Aiqin Bridge (科湳愛琴橋), which crosses over National Freeway 1 and Provincial Highway 74, has a space on the center median allocated for the line.

Red line
The Red Line is being planned.

Purple line
The Purple Line is being planned.

Network Map 
(Blue Line is being planned and the route is not a straight line, it follows Taiwan Boulevard which is not a straight line for most of the time until it goes to Shalu Railway Station)

See also

 Rail transport in Taiwan
 Transport in Taiwan

References

External links
Taichung MRT Official Website 
Taichung MRT Official Website 
Taichung MRT Official Facebook 

 
Transportation in Taichung
2021 establishments in Taiwan